The Lyricist Lounge is a hip hop showcase of rappers, emcees, DJs, and Graffiti artists.

It has spawned the album Lyricist Lounge, Volume One, Lyricist Lounge 2 and Lyricist Lounge & Ecko Unlimited presents: Underground Airplay, as well as a television show, The Lyricist Lounge Show.

The Lyricist Lounge was founded in 1991 by hip hop aficionados Danny Castro and Anthony Marshall. It was a series of open mic events hosted in a small studio apartment in the Lower East Side section of New York City.

West Coast events

East Coast events

September 2000 tour

November 1999 tour

September 1998 tour

See also
List of hip hop music festivals
Hip hop culture

References

 
Music festivals in New York City
Hip hop music festivals in the United States
Music festivals established in 1991
Street art festivals
1991 establishments in New York City